Kushki Do (also Romanized as Kūshkī Do; also known as Kūshkī) is a village in Hoseyniyeh Rural District, Alvar-e Garmsiri District, Andimeshk County, Khuzestan Province, Iran. At the 2006 census, its population was 140, in 29 different families.

References 

Populated places in Andimeshk County